As Pupilas do Senhor Reitor is a 1935 Portuguese film directed by José Leitão de Barros, starring Joaquim Almada, Maria Matos and António Silva and based on the novel of the same name by Júlio Dinis. It was released on 1 April 1935.

Cast
Joaquim Almada as Reitor
Maria Matos as Joana
António Silva as João da Esquina
Leonor d'Eça as Pupil
Maria Paula as Pupil
 Oliveira Martins as Pedro
Paiva Raposo as Daniel
Lino Ferreira as João Semana
Carlos D'Oliveira as José das Dornas
Emília de Oliveira as Senhora Teresa
 Costinha as Barbeiro
María Castelar as Francisquinha
 Perpetua as Ti' Zefa
Regina Montenegro		
Tereza Taveira

References

External links
 

1935 films
Films based on Portuguese novels
Films directed by José Leitão de Barros
Portuguese drama films
1935 drama films
Portuguese black-and-white films
1930s Portuguese-language films